Albert Road may refer to:
Albert Road Halt railway station, a disused station in Plymouth, England
Lower Albert Road, a road where major government offices are located on Government Hill in Hong Kong
Upper Albert Road, a road where the residence of the Chief Executive of Hong Kong is located on Government Hill in Hong Kong